The Massacre of Grischino was a war crime committed by members of the Red Army in February 1943 in the eastern Ukrainian town of Krasnoarmeyskoye, earlier named Postyschewo and Grischino. A total of 596 prisoners of war, nurses, construction workers and female communication personnel (Nachrichtenhelferinnen) perished. The Wehrmacht Untersuchungsstelle also known as WuSt (Wehrmacht criminal investigating authority), announced that among the victims were 406 soldiers of the Wehrmacht, 58 members of the Organisation Todt (including two Danish nationals), 89 Italian soldiers, nine Romanian soldiers, four Hungarian soldiers, 15 German civil officials, seven German civilian workers and eight Ukrainian volunteers.

The places were overrun by the Soviet 4th Guards Tank Corps on the night of 10 and 11 February 1943. After their recapture by the 5th SS Panzer Division Wiking with the support of the 333rd Infantry and 7th Panzer Divisions on 18 February 1943, the German soldiers discovered numerous corpses. Many of the bodies were horribly mutilated, ears and noses cut off and genitals amputated and stuffed into their mouths. The breasts of some of the nurses had been cut off, the women being brutally raped. A German military judge who was at the scene stated in an interview during the 1970s that he saw a female body with her legs spread-eagled and a broomstick rammed into her genitals. In the cellar of the main train station, around 120 Germans had been herded into a large storage room and then mowed down with machine guns. While a large part of the investigation file is lost, some investigation evidence remained in a Foreign Office brochure currently stored in the German federal state archive (Bundesarchiv).

On 21 March 1983, the West German Radio (WDR) broadcast a documentary on Soviet war crimes in the east from the files of the Wehrmacht investigative authority which also showed footage of the propaganda troops of the Wehrmacht on the massacre of Grischino and witnesses of the massacre had a chance to speak.

See also
Massacre of Broniki
Massacre of Feodosia

References

Literature
The warfare from the perspective of the Soviet Union. In: Horst Boog, Jürgen Förster, Joachim Hoffmann (ed. and authors) : The German Reich and the Second World War, 10 vols, Volume 4, The attack on the Soviet Union, German publishing house, Stuttgart 1983, ISBN 3 - 421-06098-3, 790 pp.
German and Kalmyks, 1942–1945. Rombach Verlag, Freiburg 1974, pp. 107ff. 
Alfred de Zayas : The Wehrmacht investigative body. German investigations into Allied violations of international law during the Second World War. 7 Edition, Universitas Verlag, Munich 2001, .

1943 in the Soviet Union
Soviet World War II crimes
Germany–Soviet Union relations
World War II prisoner of war massacres by the Soviet Union
February 1943 events